is the ninth studio album by the Japanese singer/songwriter Chisato Moritaka, released on July 25, 1994. This was Moritaka's first album under One Up Music. The album includes the song "Kaze ni Fukarete", which became her first No. 1 hit on the Oricon singles chart. Step by Step is Moritaka's first album in to include a cover version of a Beatles song. A limited edition release included a 32-page photo book.

Before the album's release, Moritaka was forced to stop touring after she suffered a temporomandibular joint dysfunction in spring 1994. She did not tour or release another studio album until 1996.

The album reached No. 3 on Oricon's albums chart and sold over 573,000 copies. It was certified Platinum by the RIAJ.

Track listing

Personnel 
 Chisato Moritaka – vocals, drums (all tracks), rhythm guitar (2), piano (2–3, 12)
 Yuichi Takahashi – guitar, backing vocals (1–3, 5–7, 11–13, 15), synthesizer (2, 11, 15), bass synthesizer (3)
 Hiroyoshi Matsuo – guitar (1, 3, 7, 12–13)
 Yuko Nōji – guitar (2)
 Hideo Saitō – guitar, bass, keyboards, synthesizer, backing vocals (4–5, 10, 13), sitar (4), tambourine (5, 10, 13)
 Eiji Ogata – guitar (12)
 Jun Takahashi – guitar (13)
 Yasuaki Maejima – piano (2, 7–11), synthesizer (7–9), electric piano (8)
 Masafumi Yokoyama – bass (1)
 Yukio Seto – bass (2, 5, 7, 11–12, 15), guitar (8, 11), synthesizer (12)
 Seiji Ishikawa – cowbell (5)
 Hiyoshimaru – percussion (12)

Charts

Certification

References

External links 
 
 

1994 albums
Chisato Moritaka albums
Japanese-language albums